Ricard Sánchez Sendra (born 22 February 2000) is a Spanish professional footballer who plays as a defender for Granada CF.

Club career
Born in Sant Jaume dels Domenys, Tarragona, Catalonia, Sánchez joined FC Barcelona's La Masia in 2013, from Gimnàstic de Tarragona. He left the club in 2017, and played briefly for CD Toledo before joining Atlético Madrid in 2018.

After making his senior debut with the reserves in Segunda División B, Sánchez made his first team debut on 16 December 2020, starting and scoring the second in a 3–0 Copa del Rey win against CE Cardassar. He made his professional – and La Liga – debut the following 20 February, in a 0–2 home defeat against Levante UD.

On 31 August 2021, Sánchez signed a four-year deal with fellow top tier side Granada CF, and was immediately loaned to CD Lugo in Segunda División for the season.

International career
Sánchez is a former Spanish youth international. He was part of Spanish squad which won 2019 UEFA European Under-19 Championship.

Career statistics

Club

Honours
Spain U19
UEFA European Under-19 Championship: 2019

References

External links
 
 

2000 births
Living people
People from Baix Penedès
Sportspeople from the Province of Tarragona
Association football defenders
Spanish footballers
Footballers from Catalonia
La Liga players
Segunda División B players
Atlético Madrid footballers
Atlético Madrid B players
Granada CF footballers
CD Lugo players
Spain youth international footballers
Spain under-21 international footballers